Mikhail Anatolyevich Ponomarenko (born 21 February 1999) is a Russian football player. He plays for Finnish club OTP.

Club career
He made his debut in the Russian Football National League for Luch Vladivostok on 14 August 2019 in a game against Chayka Peschanokopskoye, as a starter.

References

External links
 Profile by Russian Football National League
 
 

1999 births
People from Blagoveshchensk
Sportspeople from Amur Oblast
Living people
Russian footballers
Association football goalkeepers
FC Zenit Saint Petersburg players
FC VSS Košice players
FC Luch Vladivostok players
Oulun Työväen Palloilijat players
Russian First League players
Russian Second League players
Kakkonen players
Russian expatriate footballers
Expatriate footballers in Slovakia
Russian expatriate sportspeople in Slovakia
Expatriate footballers in Finland
Russian expatriate sportspeople in Finland